Minuscule 825 (in the Gregory-Aland numbering), ε308 (von Soden), is a 13th-century Greek minuscule manuscript of the New Testament on parchment.

Description 
The codex contains the text of the four Gospels, on 337 parchment leaves (size ). The text is written in one column per page, 21 lines per page.

According to Scrivener it is a beautiful codex.

Text 
The Greek text of the codex is a representative of the Byzantine text-type. Hermann von Soden classified it to the textual family Kx. Aland placed it in Category V.

According to the Claremont Profile Method it represents textual family Kr in Luke 1, Luke 10, and Luke 20. It is a weak member of the cluster 189.

The text of the Pericope Adulterae (John 7:53-8:11) is marked by an obelus.

History 

C. R. Gregory dated the manuscript to the 13th century, other palaeographers dated it to the 11th century. Currently the manuscript is dated by the INTF to the 13th century.

The manuscript was brought from Corfu by Joseph Schirus, a monk, in 1729, and presented by him to the library in Grottaferrata. It was examined and described by Antonio Rocci in 1882. It was added to the list of New Testament manuscripts by Scrivener (623) and Gregory (825e). Gregory saw it in 1886.

Currently the manuscript is housed at the Biblioteca della Badia (A' α. 2), in Grottaferrata.

See also 

 List of New Testament minuscules
 Biblical manuscript
 Textual criticism
 Minuscule 824

References

Further reading 

 
 Antonio Rocci, Codices cryptenses, seu Abbatiae Cryptae Ferratae in Tusculano digesti et illustrati (Tusculanum 1883), pp. 2–4.

Greek New Testament minuscules
13th-century biblical manuscripts